The U.S. Ski Team, operating under the auspices of U.S. Ski & Snowboard, develops and supports men's and women's athletes in the sports of alpine skiing, freestyle skiing, cross-country, ski jumping, and Nordic combined. Since 1974 the team and association have been headquartered in Park City, Utah.

These individuals represent the best athletes in the country for their respective sports and compete as a team at the national, world and Olympic level.

History 
*The first U.S. Ski Team was officially named in 1965 for the 1966 season, however the United States participated in skiing at all Olympic Winter Games and sent various athletes to World Championships prior to the '66 season.

1860s - 1880s Early Ski Clubs and Ski Tournaments in the U.S.

Ski clubs appeared in the United States starting in 1861, in California. Norwegian "snowshoe" downhill races are noted in Sierra and Rocky Mountain mining camps.  The Nansen Ski Club of Berlin, New Hampshire, was founded by Norwegian immigrants and named in honor of Norway's legendary Arctic explorer Fridtjof Nansen. It continues to operate. Annual ski jumping tournaments began in Great Lakes mining and timber regions. The Saint Paul Winter Carnival included skiing events starting in 1888.

1891 - 1893 Central Ski Association of the Northwest tournaments

A regional ski association is formed by the Eau Claire (Dovre), Ishpeming (Norden), Stillwater (Norwegian), Red Wing (Aurora), and Minneapolis clubs, but dissolves after an economic downturn and a couple low snow winters.

1905 National Ski Association

The National Ski Association of America, the forerunner of the present-day U.S. Ski & Snowboard, was founded on Feb. 21, 1905 in Ishpeming, Michigan. A meeting was held by the Ishpeming Ski Club in conjunction with its 1904 ski jumping tournament in Ishpeming - but the association was not formed at that gathering. Club President Carl Tellefsen proposed holding a meeting after the 1905 jumping tournament – a national competition – to found a ski association which, among other duties, would oversee jumping tournaments. In 1905, the association was formally organized during a meeting attended by officers from the Ishpeming, Minneapolis, Red Wing, Stillwater and Eau Claire ski clubs. On Feb. 21, 1905, Carl Tellefsen announced the National Ski Association of America with himself as its first president.

1910 International Ski Commission

In 1910, the International Ski Commission was formed at the first International Ski Congress to develop rules for international ski competitions. On Feb. 2, 1924 in Chamonix, France, while what would come to be recognized as the first Winter Olympic Games were being held, the commission gave way to the International Ski Federation (FIS); 14 member nations were present at the founding; 108 are FIS members today.

1924 Inaugural Olympic Winter Games at Chamonix, France

The first Winter Olympic Games actually were under the banner of International Sports Week, but were renamed the Winter Olympic Games in 1924 after organizers saw how successful they were (and after Norway, which had opposed "Winter Olympic" events because of concern Norwegians wouldn't dominate, saw it would be a winter power) supported the concept. Only Nordic skiing events were held, including cross country, ski jumping (then the premier ski event everywhere) and Nordic combined. Sixteen nations competed.

Anders Haugen, a Norwegian immigrant to the United States, was listed as fourth in ski jumping because of a calculation error. In 1974, as Norwegians prepared to celebrate the 50th anniversary of those first Winter Games, a recalculation in Oslo found Haugen was the real bronze medalist and not Thorleif Haug (1894–1934). A medal presentation was arranged in Oslo, where a frail Haugen received the bronze medal from the daughter of Thorleif Haug, who had been dead since the Thirties. Haugen's medal remains the only jumping medal won by an American in the Olympics or World Championships. Originally, the IOC did not recognize the medal exchange and kept Haug listed as its 1924 bronze medalist for years before recognizing Haugen as the legitimate medal-winner.

First FIS World Championships: Nordic (1925) and Alpine (1931)

International competitive skiing was still primarily a European sport in the Twenties. Although the United States participated in the Winter Olympics of 1924, '28 and '32 - where there were only Nordic events, there was no U.S. Ski Team. Athletes were selected for the various championships.

1932 Olympic Winter Games at Lake Placid, New York

The 1932 Summer Games were headed to Los Angeles, and Godfrey Dewey – whose father had founded the Lake Placid Club – championed Lake Placid over a half-dozen other candidates for the Winter Games (including Denver; Minneapolis and Duluth, Minnesota; Yosemite and Lake Tahoe, California; and Bear Mountain, New York). Then-Gov. Franklin D. Roosevelt pledged to build a bobsled run and Dewey, who had arranged a posting as manager of the 1928 Olympic Ski Team, parlayed those contacts to land the 1932 Winter Olympics for the small Adirondacks village. Some 300 athletes from 17 nations competed. Skiing was still limited to Nordic events; top US skier was another jumper, Casper Oimoen, who finished fifth.

*** This was the first major international ski event in the United States

1935 U.S. sends first alpine team to FIS World Championships

The championships returned to Mürren, Switzerland, site of the first official alpine championships in 1931. Six men, seven women were on that first official U.S. squad at Worlds.

1936 Alpine added to Olympic Winter Games at Garmisch-Partenkirchen, Germany

Alpine skiing was introduced to the Olympics with a single event, the combined (one downhill run and two slalom runs). While Nordic remained an all-male province, alpine was opened to men and women. Germans took gold and silver in both the men's and women's alpine combined events; Franz Pfnür and Christl Cranz were the new champions; Dick Durrance, who grew up in Florida but spent several years in Germany learning to ski before Hitler took power, was the runaway best U.S. skier, finishing 10th.

For the only time, the FIS authorized a World Championships in addition to the Olympics with alpine championship races held in Innsbruck, Austria.

1948 Olympics return with first U.S. alpine medals at St. Moritz, Switzerland

The Olympics (with Germany and Japan barred from competing) returned after a 12-year hiatus, with American Gretchen Fraser (then of Vancouver, WA, later of Sun Valley, ID) winning the first two U.S. Olympic ski medals – and they came on the same day, Feb. 5; the combined downhill had been run the previous day and when she won the slalom, it gave her second place in the combined calculation. In addition to the combined, which debuted in 1936, alpine added both elements of combined as individual events, meaning alpine was now equal with Nordic, having three events (slalom, downhill and the combined; however, there were no women's Nordic events until 1952).
 
Fraser led U.S. skiers, collecting the first medals by a U.S. skier - gold in slalom and silver in combined. The U.S. women's team captain, Dodie Post, broke her ankle in a practice session and was unable to compete. The team also included a talented young teen – Andrea Mead, 15, whose parents owned Pico Peak, near Rutland, VT.

Also of note, Gordon Wren (Steamboat Springs, CO) qualified for all four individual ski teams. He eventually competed only in jumping. "I was going ragged, bumping into myself, trying to train, ski alpine, cross country and the rest, so I decided to focus on jumping," he explained. He finished fifth.

1950 World Championships in U.S.: Lake Placid, NY (Nordic) and Aspen, CO (alpine)

Poor snow in the Adirondacks almost forced cancellation of the Nordic events, but, alerted by 1948 Olympic cross country racer Chummy Broomhall that there was more than a foot of snow in his hometown of Rumford, Maine, officials agreed to stage opening ceremonies and the jumping events in Lake Placid, then everyone drove to Rumford for the cross country competitions. At one point, Broomhall helped set the race tracks – no machine-setting equipment in those days, so skiers would ski-in the tracks – and then went home to change into his racing outfit; traffic at the site meant Broomhall missed his scheduled start time, but officials let him run at the end of the pack.

The alpine Worlds, organized by racing great Dick Durrance, then general manager at the fledgling Aspen Ski Area, included slalom, downhill, and the first appearance of giant slalom. American Katy Rodolph of Colorado led the US, finishing fifth in the women's downhill. Aspen was established as an alpine destination as a result of the successful World Championships.

1960 Olympics return to U.S. at Olympic Valley, CA

The young Squaw Valley resort near Lake Tahoe in California ushered in a new Olympic era under the direction of Alexander Cushing. No bobsled run was built but the skiing was memorable. In cross country, Squaw Valley introduced the initial machine-set tracks; everything had been walked or skied in before Squaw Valley but – with Al Merrill and Chummy Broomhall setting the tone as chief of competition and chief of course, respectively – snow machines were used to help groom Nordic courses for the first time.

1962 NSA renamed U.S. Ski Association (USSA)

The 57-year-old National Ski Association got a new name as the U.S. Ski Association. The renamed organization moved from Denver to Colorado Springs, CO.

Also, the U.S. Ski Education Foundation, designed to "Establish, administer and promote educational programs devoted to the development and training of skiers" and promote ski museums, was founded Oct. 8, 1862 (and chartered June 13, 1964). By enabling donors to receive tax deductions for contributions, it would become the fundraising arm of the U.S. Ski Team, the forerunner of the U.S. Ski and Snowboard Team Foundation.

1964 U.S. alpine men earn first Olympic medals at Innsbruck, Austria

The Olympics came to Austria for the first time in 1964. U.S. men earned their first medals Feb. 8 as Billy Kidd (Stowe, VT) won silver in slalom and Jimmie Heuga (Tahoe City, CA) took slalom bronze. Jean Saubert (Hillsborough, OR) was a double medalist, tying for silver in giant slalom and collecting bronze in slalom.

1965 Bob Beattie named U.S. Ski Team alpine head coach

In 1965, the USSA took the first steps in the formation of a formal U.S. Ski Team by naming its first head alpine coach. At the annual USSA convention on June 21 in Spokane, Bob Beattie was named the first full-time U.S. alpine skiing head coach. "When you think you're going too fast--accelerate!" he would goad team members. Chuck Ferries, a 1964 Olympian, was named assistant coach, with primary responsibilities as head coach of the women's alpine team. Ferries took leave from his job with Head Ski Co. to coach, and was named full-time women's coach in 1966. No full-time Nordic jumping or skiing coaches were yet designated.

1973 National Training Centers created

National Training Centers were created for both national alpine and Nordic teams. It was opened Oct. 28 in three old, mid-mountain, mining buildings at Park City Ski Area (now Park City Mountain Resort). Former Alpine Director Willy Schaeffler was the center's director.

1974 U.S. Ski Team moves to Park City, UT

In the summer of 1974 the alpine portion of the U.S. Ski Team relocated from USSA's Denver office to Park City, Utah. The athletes and coaches began utilizing the Alpine Training Center, a building designed by Willy Schaeffler, that opened in old mining buildings at Park City Ski Area. Administrative offices were set up in the old Mountain Air Grocery on lower Main Street. Eventually, the Ski Team move up the hill to the old Treasure Mountain Inn.

1976 USSA and U.S. Ski Team split

In 1976 the USSA and the U.S. Ski Team agreed to part ways. The USSA continued to control the rules and governance of the sport, as well as organizing travel programs for recreational skiers, while the U.S. Ski Team focused solely on the elite national team.

1988 USSA and U.S. Ski Team rejoin

After years of operating separately, the USSA and U.S. Ski Team were merged once again in the Summer of 1998 under the direction of Thomas Weisel. Weisel proposed the creation of a ‘super-board’ consisting of 15 people representing the leadership of both organizations. USSA CEO Howard Peterson was selected to lead the new  organization and the USSA moved its national offices from Colorado Springs to join the U.S. Ski Team in Park City, UT, establishing its headquarters at its present location on 1500 Kearns Blvd.

2007 Center of Excellence Groundbreaking

The USSA broke ground on the Center of Excellence on July 18, 2007. Upon opening in 2009, the Center of Excellence housed world-class high-performance athletic facilities including strength-training areas, a gymnasium, a climbing wall, ski and snowboard ramps, trampolines, a nutrition center and rehabilitation facilities. Additionally, educational areas for athletes, coaches and clubs such as a computer lab, multimedia rooms for performance analysis and equipment workshops are available. All of the educational resources are shared with the USSA's 400 clubs around the country.

Making the U.S. Ski Team 
Interested young athletes generally begin competing through one of 425 local U.S. Ski and Snowboard Association clubs located in communities around the country, generally at ski and snowboard resorts. Clubs provide introductory education and training, as well as competition programs.

Each U.S. Ski Team sport is also organized at a regional and divisional level, with slight variances by sport. Alpine skiing, for example, is organized in three regions: Eastern, Rocky/Central and Western. Within those regions are divisions including Northern, Eastern, Southern, Central, Rocky Mountain, Intermountain, Far West and Alaska. In some areas, such as New England, there are also state-based organizations.

Competition programs are held within each region or division leading up to national and international events. From these competitions, athletes earn points and are ranked nationally with the highest ranking athletes earning nominations to join the US national teams, which compete at the World Cup level.

U.S. Ski & Snowboard is one of the only Olympic sports in the United States to support a full-time standing national team in every sport. Teams are nominated each spring or summer based on results. Teams for FIS World Championships (held every odd year) and Olympic Winter Games (held every four years) are selected by specific criteria and named for those individual events.

U.S. Alpine Highlights

Olympic Winter Games

Alpine World Championships

Alpine World Cup

U.S. Freestyle Highlights

Olympic Winter Games

World Freestyle Championships

Freestyle World Cup

U.S. Cross-Country Highlights

Olympic Winter Games

World Cross-Country Championships

Cross-Country World Cup

U.S. Nordic Combined Highlights

Olympic Winter Games

World Nordic Combined Championships

Nordic Combined World Cup

U.S. Jumping Highlights

Olympic Winter Games

Ski Jumping World Cup

References

External links
U.S. Ski & Snowboard Association official site
International Ski Federation

Skiing in the United States
Skiing
Ski
Park City, Utah
USA
1965 establishments in the United States